At Dawn is the second studio album by American rock band My Morning Jacket. Produced by group frontman Jim James, the album was released on April 6, 2001 by Darla Records. The Kentucky-based group had begun several years prior when James needed an outlet for folky, acoustic songs. Its first album for independent label Darla, 1999's The Tennessee Fire, attracted a devoted following in the Netherlands, prompting the young band to tour heavily.

At Dawn is a turning point for the band in its steps toward more ambitious song lengths and eclecticism in other genres. Like its predecessor, the group recorded the album at James' extended family's soybean farm in rural Kentucky. He recorded his vocals in an abandoned grain silo to take advantage of its natural reverb.

Background
My Morning Jacket was started by singer-songwriter Jim James in Louisville, Kentucky in 1998. James created the project as an acoustic outlet for songs he felt were unsuitable for his main band, Month of Sundays. He recruited his cousin Johnny Quaid on guitar, Tom Blankenship on bass, and J. Glenn on drums, and the quartet signed to independent label Darla Records. Their debut album, The Tennessee Fire (1999), attracted a devoted following in the Netherlands, prompting the band to secure management and tour heavily.

Like its predecessor, At Dawn was recorded at Quaid's rural family farm in Shelbyville, Kentucky, a city outside Louisville. The group converted an apartment above a three-car garage at the property into a home studio, which they called Above the Cadillac. James recorded his vocals in an abandoned grain silo, utilizing its natural reverb. He professed a love for atmospheric, "huge open sounds, such as vocals cut far away from the mic in a big room," specifically pointing to the Rolling Stones' Exile on Main Street, or John Bonham's drum work on Led Zeppelin albums. James noted the group committed themselves to recording: "we locked ourselves in for many days with all the necessary elements–lights, candles, Madonna’s Immaculate Collection, Dreamcast and cookies." Years later, he looked back fondly at the process, highlighting his youth and inexperience: "We were just so green and just such infants, we didn't really know anything about professional recording or anything like that, but we recorded it all ourselves and recorded it all to tape and just had a really amazing time out there," he said. It was the first time the quartet made an album with the foresight that, due to their burgeoning overseas fanbase, people would be listening. After recording, James co-mixed the album with David Trumfio at Kingsize Sound Labs.

At Dawn has been described as a "loose, sprawling collection of folk-rock songs that hearken back to the glory days of classic rock." The Chicago Tribune John Cook characterized that the use of reverb "lends it the character of a distant transmission, a dispatch from a different time." James clarified the band's mission in a 2001 interview: "We’re just trying to bring rock ’n’ roll back to the table, plain and simple [...] pure rock ’n’ roll with a heart that beats for the common man." James wrote "The Way That He Sings" about his favorite vocalists, specifically Roy Orbison and Neil Young, and their intonation and voice.

Release

At Dawn was first issued on compact disc in Belgium and the Netherlands on March 30, 2001 through Darla Records. The label made it available for mail order on April 5 in the U.S. and elsewhere, with a general retail release occurring on April 17. The first 2500 copies on CD included a bonus disc of demos that James recorded in his bedroom, which was also included with the album's original vinyl release, which followed on April 28, 2001. Darla made "The Way That He Sings" available on its website as a preview for the upcoming album.

The album bolstered the band's fanbase in their home country, earning praise from Foo Fighters frontman Dave Grohl, with whom the group later toured, as well as English band Doves.

Track listing

 Track 4 is listed as "Death Is the Easy Way" in the liner notes.
 Track 12 is listed as "Phone Went Dead" in the liner notes.
 Track 14 is not shown in the album's track listing, but is credited as such in the "For the Record" section of the liner notes. It is often listed as "Hidden Song #1", "Untitled Bonus Track", "Mediate, Try Not To Hate... Love Yer Mate, Like Sex On 8...", or "Bonus Track."

Personnel
Jim James – vocals, guitars, harmonica, banjo
Johnny Quaid – guitar
Two Tone Tommy – bass guitar
J. Glenn – drums
Keenan Lawler– Resonator guitar
Danny Cash – keyboards

References

External links
 

My Morning Jacket albums
2001 albums
Albums produced by Jim James
Darla Records albums
Albums recorded in a home studio